Lamellaria ophione is a species of small, sluglike sea snail, a marine gastropod mollusc in the family Velutinidae.

References
 Powell A. W. B., New Zealand Mollusca, William Collins Publishers Ltd, Auckland, New Zealand 1979 

Velutinidae
Gastropods of New Zealand
Gastropods described in 1850
Taxa named by John Edward Gray